The Karol Poznański Palace is a former residence in Łódź, central Poland. It was constructed in 1904.

It houses today the rectorate of the Academy of Music in Łódź.

See also
 Izrael Poznański Palace

References

Poznański Palace, Karol
1904 establishments in Poland
Buildings and structures completed in 1904